CJNE-FM is a radio station in Nipawin, Saskatchewan. Owned by Norman H.J. and Treana J. Rudock, it broadcasts a broad oldies format.

The station received approval by the CRTC on January 10, 2002. In January 2020, it received approval for a second station on 89.5 FM, which will carry a country music format.

Transmitters

References

External links
CJNE-FM
 

JNE
JNE
Radio stations established in 2002
2002 establishments in Saskatchewan